The Plunkett Foundation is a charity with the purpose to assist rural communities in the United Kingdom to create and run community-owned businesses. The organisation aims to support community-owned enterprises in the United Kingdom. It also aims to raise awareness for community-ownership potential to be successful in rural areas, and to make it easier for rural communities to start such businesses.

History

The Plunkett Foundation was founded in 1919 by the pioneer of rural co-operation in Ireland, Sir Horace Plunkett. Since being founded it has been involved in a range of work relating to international development, rural development and agricultural development. The foundation is based in Woodstock, Oxfordshire, England.

To celebrate 2012 being designated as the United Nations International Year of Co-operatives, the Plunkett Foundation held the World of Rural Co-operation International Roundtable event. This event led to the development of the Dunsany Declaration for Rural Co-operative Development, which has fed into the Blueprint for a Co-operative Decade.

See also 
Malcolm Lyall Darling

References 

Charities based in Oxfordshire